Dan Rudin is an American record producer, audio and mix engineer, who has amassed thousands of hours in studios across the country, receiving two Grammy Awards, and several gold and platinum records in the process.

Rudin began his recording career working as a studio runner and general assistant at AAA Recording Studio, in Dorchester, Massachusetts, while still in high school. After studying music and electrical engineering at the University of Miami in Miami, Florida, he moved to New York, New York in 1986, where he took an entry-level position at the Hit Factory studios on 54th St. He went on to work at New York's Record Plant Studios and eventually became chief staff engineer at Grandslam Recording in West Orange, New Jersey. He was surrounded and mentored by some of New York's best engineers and producers (William Wittman, Doug Oberkircher, Rick Kerr, Kooster McCallister), and used the opportunity to learn and polish his engineering skills.

Since 1989, Rudin has resided in Nashville, Tennessee. Working as a freelance engineer and producer in studios around the city and around the country, he worked on many projects in rock, pop, gospel and jazz recording. He became a frequent contributor to projects by producers Richard Dodd, Peter Furler, Tommy Simms, Chris McDonald and Joe Baldridge. In 2006, he opened his own recording facility, My Space Recording, at the former site of Nashville's Money Pit studio.

Rudin's extensive record and film client list includes The Loudhorns, Tempest, Riders In The Sky, Pixar, High School Musical 2, Chayenne, Matt Belsante, Tommy Torres, Billy Dean, Wynonna, Flick, The Newsboys, Puffy AmiYumi, Alberto Plaza and Disney, original scores for films  Boundin', Sioux City and The Pirates Who Don’t Do Anything.  His work with Riders in the Sky earned him two Grammy Awards, and collaboration on Pixar's Academy Award winning short film, For the Birds.

From 1999 through 2005, Rudin was a scoring, mix and mastering engineer for music education curricula from two leading publishers, Silver Burdett's Making Music and McGraw-Hill's Share the Music.  Together more than 3000 tracks, both projects involved a wide variety of styles, periods, instruments and ensembles.

He has also recorded dozens of Broadway musicals and licensing adaptations for Music Theatre International and Disney Theatrical. Other award-winning projects Rudin has contributed to include JoEl Sonnier's Cajun Mardi Gras, 2006 Grammy nominee for best traditional folk album, Andy Griffith's 1996 Grammy winning I Love to Tell the Story, and Ricardo Arjona's Independiente which earned Rudin two 2012 Latin Grammy nominations.

Currently, Rudin continues to record and mix music of many styles for a variety of uses.

References

External links
Dan Rudin Official Website

Year of birth missing (living people)
Living people
American record producers
American audio engineers
Grammy Award winners
People from Nashville, Tennessee
University of Miami alumni